Salvatore Mooney Giancana (born Gilormo Giangana; ; May 24, 1908 – June 19, 1975) was an American mobster who was boss of the Chicago Outfit from 1957 to 1966.

Giancana was born in Chicago to Italian immigrant parents. He joined the 42 Gang as a teenager, developing a reputation in organized crime which gained him the notice of Chicago Outfit leaders. During the late 1930s, Giancana joined the Chicago Outfit. From the 1940s through the 1950s, he controlled the illegal gambling, illegal liquor distribution, and political rackets in Louisiana. In the early 1940s, Giancana was involved in Chicago's African-American lottery payout system for the Outfit. In 1957, Giancana became the boss of the Chicago Outfit.

According to some sources, Giancana and the Mafia were involved in John F. Kennedy's victory in the 1960 presidential election. During the 1960s, he was recruited by the Central Intelligence Agency (CIA) in a plot to assassinate Cuban leader Fidel Castro. Conspiracy theorists consider Giancana along with Mafia leaders Santo Trafficante Jr. and Carlos Marcello associated with the assassination of Kennedy. In 1965, Giancana was convicted of contempt of court, serving one year in prison. After his release from prison, Giancana fled to Cuernavaca, Mexico. In 1974, he was deported to the United States, returning to Chicago. Giancana was murdered on June 19, 1975, in Oak Park, Illinois, shortly before he was scheduled to appear before the Church Committee.

Early life
Giancana was born Gilormo Giangana on May 24, 1908, in The Patch neighborhood of Chicago to Antonio Giangana and Antonia DeSimmona, Italian immigrants from Castelvetrano, Sicily, Italy. His father immigrated in 1905, while his mother immigrated in 1906; he had seven siblings. Antonia died in 1910 and his father married Mary Leonardi. On September 23, 1933, Giancana married Angeline DeTolve, the daughter of immigrants from the Italian region of Basilicata. They had three daughters, Antoinette born 1935, Bonnie born 1938, and Francine born 1945. Angeline died on April 23, 1954, leaving him to raise his daughters.

Early criminal career
Giancana joined the 42 Gang, a juvenile street crew working for political boss Joseph Esposito. The 42 Gang's name was a reference to Ali Baba and the 40 Thieves. They thought they were one better, hence 42. Giancana soon developed a reputation as an excellent getaway driver, a high earner, and a vicious killer. After Esposito's murder, in which Giancana was allegedly involved, the 42 Gang was transformed into a de facto extension of the Chicago Outfit with leaders such as Frank "the Enforcer" Nitti, Paul "the Waiter" Ricca, and Tony "Joe Batters" Accardo. He was first arrested in 1925, for auto theft. He soon graduated to "triggerman" and by the age of 20 had been the prime subject of three murder investigations, but never tried for any of them. In 1929, Giancana was convicted of burglary and larceny, and sentenced to one to five years in the Joliet Correctional Center. He was released in 1932, after serving three years and nine months.

During the late 1930s, Giancana became the first 42er to join the Chicago Outfit. From the early 1940s through the 1950s, he controlled most of the illegal gambling, illegal liquor distribution, and numerous other political rackets in Louisiana through longtime friend H. A. (Hol) Killian. Killian controlled the majority of the liquor license issuance by his associations with longtime New Orleans business associate Carlos Marcello. In 1939 Giancana was convicted of bootlegging, and sentenced to four years in Leavenworth Prison and Terre Haute Federal Correctional Complex.

Rise to power
After his release from prison in 1942, Giancana made a name for himself by convincing Accardo, then the Outfit's underboss, to stage a takeover of Chicago's African-American "policy" (lottery) payout system for the Outfit. Giancana's crew is believed to have been responsible for convincing Eddie Jones to quit his racket and leave the country. Giancana's crew was also responsible for the August 4, 1952 murder of African-American gambling boss Theodore Roe. Both Jones and Roe were major South Side gambling bosses. Roe had refused to surrender control of his operation as the Outfit had demanded, and on June 19, 1951, Roe fatally shot Leonard "Fat Lennie" Caifano, a made man of Giancana's crew.

The Outfit's South Side "policy"-game takeover was not complete until another Outfit member, Jackie "the Lackey" Cerone, scared "Big Jim" Martin to Mexico with two bullets to the head that did not kill him. When the lottery money started rolling in for the Outfit after this gambling war, the amount this game produced for the Outfit was in the millions of dollars a year and brought Giancana further notice. It is believed to have been a major factor in his being "anointed" as the Outfit's new boss in 1957. Accardo joined Ricca in semi-retirement, becoming the Outfit's consigliere. However, it was generally understood that Accardo and Ricca still had the real power. Giancana was required to consult Accardo and Ricca on all important Outfit affairs.

Giancana was present at the Mafia's 1957 Apalachin meeting at the Upstate New York estate of Joseph Barbara. Later, Buffalo crime boss Stefano Magaddino and Giancana were overheard on a wiretap saying the meeting should have occurred in the Chicago area. Giancana claimed that the Chicago area was "the safest place in the world" for a major underworld meeting because he had several police chiefs on his payroll. If the syndicate ever wanted to hold a meeting in or around Chicago, Giancana said, they had nothing to fear because they had the area "locked up tight".

Some journalists claimed that Giancana and his Chicago crime syndicate "played a role" in John F. Kennedy's victory in the 1960 presidential election.

Hyman Larner was an associate of Giancana's who helped expand the Outfit's gambling and smuggling operations to Panama and Iran, moving the Miami operation's headquarters to Panama where money laundering was more easily facilitated by local banks. These operations were conducted as a partnership between the Mafia and the CIA. By 1966, this partnership had developed into arms smuggling to the Middle East for the Israeli Mossad, all via Panama. Richard Cain, a corrupt police officer, also made "frequent trips" to and from Mexico as Giancana's courier and financial adviser.

Alleged CIA connections
It is widely reputed and was partially corroborated by the Church Committee hearings that during the Kennedy administration, the CIA recruited Giancana and other mobsters to assassinate Fidel Castro. Giancana reportedly said that CIA and the Cosa Nostra were "different sides of the same coin".

Judith Exner claimed to be the mistress of both Giancana and JFK, and that she delivered communications between them about Castro. Giancana's daughter Antoinette has stated that her father was performing a scam to pocket millions of CIA dollars.

Documents released during 1997 revealed that some Mafiosi worked with CIA on assassination attempts against Castro. CIA documents released during 2007 confirmed that during September 1960, CIA recruited ex-FBI agent Robert Maheu to meet with the West Coast representative of the Chicago mob, Johnny Roselli. When Maheu contacted Roselli, Maheu hid that he was sent by CIA, instead portraying himself an advocate for international corporations. He offered $150,000 to have Castro killed, but Roselli refused any pay. Roselli introduced Maheu to two men he called Sam Gold and Joe. "Sam Gold" was Giancana; "Joe" was Santo Trafficante Jr., the Tampa syndicate boss and one of the most powerful mobsters in prerevolution Cuba. Glenn Kessler of The Washington Post explained: "After Fidel Castro led a revolution that toppled the government of Fulgencio Batista in 1959, CIA was desperate to eliminate Castro. So, the agency sought out a partner equally worried about Castro—the Mafia, which had lucrative investments in Cuban casinos."

According to the declassified CIA "Family Jewels" documents, Giancana and Trafficante were contacted in September 1960 about the possibility of an assassination attempt by Maheu after Maheu had contacted Roselli, a Mafia member in Las Vegas and Giancana's number-two man. Maheu had presented himself as a representative of numerous international businesses in Cuba that Castro was expropriating. He offered $150,000 for the "removal" of Castro through this operation, though the documents suggest that neither Roselli, Giancana, nor Trafficante accepted any payment for the job. Giancana suggested using poison pills to dose Castro's food and drink. CIA gave these pills to Giancana's nominee, Juan Orta, whom Giancana presented as a corrupt official in the new Cuban government and who had access to Castro. After six attempts to introduce the poison into Castro's food, Orta abruptly demanded to be relieved of his role in the mission, giving the job to another, unnamed participant. Later, Giancana and Trafficante made a second attempt using Anthony Verona, the commander of the Cuban Exile Junta, who had, according to Trafficante, become "disaffected with the apparent ineffectual progress of the Junta." Verona requested $10,000 in expenses and $1,000 worth of communications equipment. How much work was performed for the second attempt is unknown, as the entire program was canceled soon thereafter due to the Bay of Pigs invasion in April 1961.

According to the "Family Jewels", Giancana asked Maheu to wire the room of his then mistress Phyllis McGuire, singer of the McGuire Sisters, whom he suspected of having an affair with comedian Dan Rowan. Although documents suggest Maheu acquiesced, the device was not planted because the agent who had been tasked with planting it was arrested. According to the documents, Robert F. Kennedy prohibited the prosecution of the agent and of Maheu, who was soon linked to the wire attempt, at CIA's request. Giancana and McGuire, who had a long-lasting affair, were originally introduced by Frank Sinatra. According to Antoinette Giancana, during part of the affair, McGuire had a concurrent affair with President Kennedy.

Downfall
When Giancana was called before a grand jury on June 1, 1965, he remained silent despite being granted immunity, which resulted in his jailing for contempt for more than a year, the duration of the grand jury. Meanwhile, Giancana was deposed as operational boss by Ricca and Accardo, and replaced by Joseph "Joey Doves" Aiuppa.

After his release from prison in 1966, Giancana fled to Cuernavaca, Mexico in order to avoid further grand jury questioning. He was arrested by Mexican authorities on July 19, 1974, and deported to the United States. He arrived back in Chicago on July 21, 1974.

Death

After Giancana's return to the United States, police detailed officers to guard his house in Oak Park, Illinois, but on the night of June 19, 1975, shortly before he was scheduled to appear before the Church Committee, which was investigating CIA and Cosa Nostra collusion, a gunman entered the home through the basement and shot Giancana in the head and neck seven times with a .22 caliber pistol. At around 11 p.m., Joseph DiPersio, Giancana's caretaker, found his body on the floor of the basement kitchen where he was said to be frying sausage and peppers. A week before his death, Giancana had gall bladder surgery in Houston. Giancana was interred next to his wife, Angeline, in a family mausoleum at Mount Carmel Cemetery, in Hillside, Illinois.

Within days of Giancana's murder, Michael J. Corbitt, the police chief of Willow Springs, Illinois, and a mobster associate, was told by Chicago Outfit's capo Salvatore Bastone that "Sam sure loved that little guy in Oak Park... Tony Spilotro. Yeah, he was fuckin' crazy about him. Sam put Tony on the fuckin' map, thought he was gonna be a big fuckin' man someday. Did you know that after Marshall Caifano got out of Vegas, it was Sam who wanted Tony Spilotro out there? Even lately, with all the problems with the skim and all, Sam always stood behind the guy. Tony was over to Sam's house all the time. He lived right by there. Did you know Tony even figured out a way where he could get in through the back of Sam's place without anybody seeing him? He'd go through other people's yards, go over fences, all sorts of shit." When Corbitt asked for the reason for the murder, Bastone quipped, "There's never just one reason for shit like what happened to Sam. There's a million of 'em. Let's just say that Sam should've remembered what happened to Bugsy Siegel."

Other theory
Although longtime associate Dominic "Butch" Blasi was with Giancana the night he was murdered and questioned by police as a suspect, neither the FBI nor Antoinette Giancana considers him Giancana's killer. Hitman Nicholas Calabrese told the FBI during the 2000s that he knew that Tony Accardo was part of the killing and Angelo LaPietra got rid of the gun which used a suppressor made by Frank Calabrese Sr. and Ronnie Jarret.

Another theory is that Santo Trafficante Jr. ordered Giancana's murder due to fears he was going to testify about the Mafia's involvement in CIA plots to kill Castro. Although Trafficante would have needed permission from Outfit bosses Accardo and Joseph Aiuppa, Giancana's murder coincided with the discovery of the decomposing remains of Johnny Roselli in an oil drum floating off Miami; he had been shot and chopped up before being dumped in the sea. Some suspected that Roselli was killed on Trafficante's orders.

There were rumors that the CIA may have killed Giancana because of his links to the Agency; the weapon used—a .22 pistol, more often used by clandestine operatives than mob hitmen—lends credence to this. Not surprisingly, former CIA Director William Colby said, "We had nothing to do with it." John Whitten mentioned during the Scelso deposition that he suspected William Harvey, a CIA assassin who was in the area.

See also
 List of unsolved murders

In popular culture

Movies
Giancana played a major role in the J. X. Williams movie Peep Show (1965).
The TV film Mafia Princess (1986) starring Tony Curtis as Giancana.
News footage of Giancana is featured in the movie JFK (1991).
Carmine Caridi played Giancana in the movie Ruby (1992).
The HBO made-for-TV movie Sugartime (1995) depicts Giancana's relationship with singer Phyllis McGuire with Giancana played by John Turturro.
Robert Miranda played Giancana in the television movie The Rat Pack (1998).
Peter Friedman played Giancana in the movie Power and Beauty (2002).
In the movie The Good Shepherd (2006), the character played by Joe Pesci, Joseph Palmi, was a mix of several mobsters, including Giancana, Santo Trafficante Jr., and Carlos Marcello, who were involved with the CIA's operation Family Jewels. Matt Damon's character, Edward Wilson, is depicted proposing that Palmi assist in assassinating Castro.
Al Linea plays Giancana in the movie The Irishman (2019).

Television
Giancana features in the first episode of the documentary series Mafia's Greatest Hits, on the UK history TV channel Yesterday.
Rod Steiger portrayed Giancana in the TV miniseries Sinatra (1992). 
Serge Houde portrays Giancana as a major nemesis of the Kennedy family in the television miniseries The Kennedys (2011).
The character Mob Man (uncredited) from The X-Files episode "Musings of a Cigarette Smoking Man", who is present at a planning meeting on the assassination of JFK, is likely based on Giancana.
Giancana is portrayed by Emmett Skilton in the 8-part AMC television miniseries The Making of the Mob: Chicago (2016).
Giancana's image is included in the opening credits of the Starz TV series Magic City (2012–13).
Giancana is seen and referenced at a Las Vegas casino in the TV series Timeless in the episode Atomic City (2016).

Literature
Giancana is a major character in Max Allan Collins's novels Chicago Confidential and Road to Paradise.
Giancana plays a major role in James Ellroy's fiction, most notably American Tabloid and its sequels The Cold Six Thousand and Blood's a Rover.
Giancana is the subject of the biography Mafia Princess, written by his daughter Antoinette.
Giancana is a character in Robert J. Randisi's Rat Pack novels.
Giancana is a notable character in Norman Mailer's 1991 historical fiction Harlot's Ghost.
The book Double Cross: The Explosive, Inside Story of the Mobster Who Controlled America tells the story of Giancana's life. Written by his brother Chuck Giancana, and his godson and namesake Sam Giancana, the book includes revelations about the deaths of JFK, Marilyn Monroe, and RFK.
Giancana is mentioned in Charles Brandt's narrative nonfiction book I Heard You Paint Houses (2004).
The fictional character Louie Russo in Mark Winegardner's 2004 novel The Godfather Returns may be based on Giancana.
The fictional character "Sam" in Steve Peters and Kay Stephens's novel The Outlaw Sandra Love (2013) is based on Giancana.
In the 2013 novel The Outlaw, the protagonist Sandra Love is said to have had a four-year relationship with a man named Sam, the head of the Chicago Outfit during the early 1960s.

Music
Influential rapper Kool G Rap once stated that the "G" in his name stands for Giancana. Kool G Rap released an album called The Giancana Story (2002).
 Giancana may be mentioned in the Shyne song "Edge", on his second album, Godfather Buried Alive. "Fuck comma rap's, Sam Giancana", although this is sometimes rendered as "same G and canna".
Giancana is mentioned in the song "Dope money" by The Lox ("Bring Drama 'cause Giancana got Kennedy Killed") on the album Ryde or Die Vol. 1.

Notes

References

Further reading

 

1908 births
1975 deaths
1975 murders in the United States
American crime bosses
Bootleggers
Burials at the Bishop's Mausoleum, Mount Carmel Cemetery (Hillside)
Chicago Outfit bosses
Chicago Outfit mobsters
Criminals from Chicago
Deaths by firearm in Illinois
Depression-era gangsters
Mafia hitmen
Male murder victims
Gangsters from Chicago
Murdered American gangsters of Italian descent
Murdered American gangsters of Sicilian descent
People associated with the assassination of John F. Kennedy
People from Chicago
People from Oak Park, Illinois
People murdered by the Chicago Outfit
People murdered in Illinois
Prohibition-era gangsters
Unsolved murders in the United States